Roman Catholic Diocese of Ratnapura  (Lat: Dioecesis Ratnapurensis) is a diocese of the Latin Church of the Roman Catholic Church in Sri Lanka.

Erected as the Diocese of Ratnapura in 1995, from territory in the Diocese of Galle, the diocese is suffragan to the Archdiocese of Colombo.

The current bishop is Cletus Chandrasiri Perera, appointed in 2007.

Ordinaries
Patabendige Don Albert Malcolm Ranjith (2 Nov 1995 – 1 Oct 2001), appointed to various curial positions and later appointed Archbishop of Colombo (elevated to Cardinal in 2010)
Harold Anthony Perera (29 Jan 2003 – 15 Feb 2005), appointed Bishop of Galle and later Bishop of Kurunegala
Ivan Tilak Jayasundera (20 Jan 2006 – 6 Jul 2006), resigned before episcopal consecration due to poor health
Cletus Chandrasiri Perera, O.S.B. (4 May 2007 – present)

See also
Catholic Church in Sri Lanka

References

Ratnapura